Sunset Acres  is a neighborhood of Westphal, Nova Scotia, Canada, in the Halifax Regional Municipality.

References
Explore HRM

External links
Sunset Acres on Destination Nova Scotia

Communities in Halifax, Nova Scotia